Jovianney Emmanuel Cruz is a sacred pianist from the Philippines. He has a master's degree from Manhattan School of Music and has won several international piano competitions.

In 2012 he co-founded The Baptist Music School, a music institution for under-privileged children which is influenced by El Sistema.

References 

Maria Canals International Music Competition prize-winners
José Iturbi International Piano Competition prize-winners
Living people
Filipino classical pianists
Year of birth missing (living people)
Manhattan School of Music alumni
Academic staff of the University of the Philippines
20th-century Filipino musicians
21st-century Filipino musicians
21st-century classical pianists